Rainbow Arabia is an electronic duo based in Los Angeles, California consisting of Future Pigeon and Whisky Biscuit keyboardist Danny Preston and Tiffany Preston. 

The married couple perform a brand of electronic music that combines elements of Arabic, North African, and Asian musical styles fused with American avant-garde dance pop. They released two EPs on Manimal Vinyl records since forming in early 2008: The Basta (2008) and Kabukimono (2009). They have also released the full-length album Boys and Diamonds (2011) on the Kompakt label. Rainbow Arabia have toured the US with bands like Gang Gang Dance and Julian Casablancas and played shows in Europe with Wavves and Mogwai. They cite the label Sublime Frequencies and Syrian singer Omar Souleyman as influences. Their Kabukimono EP found critical acclaim on both sides of the Atlantic. In 2011, Rainbow Arabia shifted their focus towards into more cosmic territory aligning with the venerable Kompakt Records who released their first full-length album Boys And Diamonds.
In 2013, Rainbow Arabia return with their 2nd LP, FM Sushi, further expanding their cosmic sound by adding multi-instrumentalist Dylan Ryan (Icy Demons, Sand) into the mix. Rainbow Arabia continue creating songs that are hard to describe but easy to love. In FM Sushi, they take a decidedly different direction for the group stripping away much of the tropical rhythms in favor exploring a more pulsing, immersive sound that combines krautrock's rolling synthscapes with their signature mercurial pop. The newest album, L.A. Heartbreak, is out Nov 11, 2016 on the Time No Place Label.  This album is dreamy, melodic pop that takes cues from Tangerine Dream, OMD, Moroder and Jan Hammer - confidently painting with bolder strokes with leaner, brighter production and infectious hooks evoking 80s radio pop that skew more towards Madonna and Cyndi Lauper rather than darker post-punk influences referenced on Rainbow Arabia's earlier albums.

Discography

Studio albums
Boys and Diamonds (Kompakt, 2011)
FM Sushi (Time No Place/Kompakt, 2013)
L.A. Heartbreak (Kompakt, 2016)

EPs
The Basta EP (Manimal Vinyl 2008)
Kabukimono EP (Manimal Vinyl 2009)

External links

Official Rainbow Arabia Bandcamp site
Time No Place Website
Rainbow Arabia Facebook 
Rainbow Arabia 'FM Sushi' Pitchfork Review
Rainbow Arabia Soundcloud
LA Times Article feat. Rainbow Arabia
Rainbow Arabia Kompakt Page

References

Electronic music groups from California
Musical groups from Los Angeles
Musical groups established in 2008